Pablo Sánchez Niño (born 20 October 1995) is an English professional footballer who plays as a goalkeeper for Ħamrun Spartans F.C.

Club career
On 21 February 2019, he was released from his contract with Giana Erminio by mutual consent.

Personal life
Pablo was born in London, England of Spanish parents.

References

External links

1995 births
Living people
Footballers from Greater London
English footballers
Spanish footballers
English people of Spanish descent
Association football goalkeepers
Serie C players
Serie D players
A.S. Giana Erminio players
U.S. Agropoli 1921 players
Maltese Premier League players
Ħamrun Spartans F.C. players
English expatriate footballers
English expatriate sportspeople in Italy
English expatriate sportspeople in Malta
Spanish expatriate footballers
Spanish expatriate sportspeople in Italy
Spanish expatriate sportspeople in Malta
Expatriate footballers in Italy
Expatriate footballers in Malta